Torghar District formerly also known as Kala Dhaka is the smallest district in Pakistan of Abaseen Division in Khyber Pakhtunkhwa province. It was officially separated from Mansehra District in 2011 under Article 246 of the Constitution of the Islamic Republic of Pakistan.

History 

The Torghar massif was a series of spurs running up to a central, dominating ridge line, which reached 9817 feet at its highest peak, the peak of Machai Sar. Along this ridge ran the line beyond which the British writ did not run, though the local tribes lived on both sides regardless.

The British sent more than four expeditions to subdue the Black Mountain tribes between 1852 and 1892 because Ata Mohammad Khan Swati, the Khan of Agror and Arsala Khan of Allai, and his sons intrigued against the British government.

In 1851 two officers of the British Customs (Salt) department within the borders of Tanawal were killed, allegedly by the Hasanzai sect of the Yusufzai. The British then sent an expedition under Colonel Mackeson, which destroyed a number of tribal strongholds. In 1868 the Yusufzai, instigated by the Khan of Agror, who resented the establishment of the police post at Oghi in the Agror valley, attacked that post in force, but were repulsed. Further attacks on the troops of the Khan of Tanawal, who remained loyal, followed. This culminated in a general advance of The Black Mountain (Tor Ghar) Tribes against the British position. It was repulsed, but not until 21 British villages had been burnt, and a second expedition under General Wilde had overrun the Black Mountain and secured the full submission of the tribes.

"The Black Mountain adjoins the territory of the Wali of Swat. It is so called from the dark forests of that cover its slopes. The eastern sides are held by different clans of the Swati tribes.The western ridge is the homeland of Yousafzai tribes. There is constant struggle among small tribal chiefs. The most important of these is the Nawab of Amb. He enjoys the unique distinction of being an independent chief across the Indus. The Nawab of Amb has an arms factory. He manufactures rifled cannon. This cannon can throw a solid ball 3000 yards. It is a useful weapon for pounding to pieces a tribal fortress."

In 1888 the British blockaded the area due to the raids by the Hasanzai and Akazai aided by the Madda Khel into the Agror valley. While more stringent measures were being organized, Major Battye and Captain Urmston and some sepoys of the Fifth Gurkhas were surprised and killed by Gujar dependents of the Akazai. Hashim Ali, the head of the Hasanzai and Akazai, was suspected of having instigated the attack. An expedition was sent in the same year, with the result that the tribes paid the fines imposed upon them, and agreed to the removal of Hashim Ali from Tor Ghar and the appointment in his place of his near relative and enemy Ibrahim Khan (Hasanzai Tribe Elder). In 1890 the tribe opposed the march of troops along the crest of the Black Mountain, and an expedition was sent against them in the spring of 1891. Immediately after the withdrawal of the troops, the Hindustanis and Madda Khel broke their agreement with the British Government by permitting the return of Hashim Ali Hasanzai. A second expedition was dispatched in 1892 which resulted in the complete pacification of the Black Mountain border.

2005 earthquake 
Torghar was severely affected by the Kashmir earthquake in 2005. According to a report in Time magazine: "Entire villages were devastated; in an instant, stone houses turned into burial mounds. The Indus river, flowing at the bottom of the valleys, recalls one tribal elder, Mohammed Said, "looked like water boiling inside a tea kettle"."

Mr. Shahzad Iqbal was appointed first District Public Prosecutor (DPP) of Torghar in March 2017.

Geography 
It lies between 34°32' and 34°50' N, and 72°48' and 72°58' E. It is bounded on the east by Agror and on the south by Tanawal; to the west it is bounded by Buner, to the northeast it borders with Battagram. The range has a length of 25 to 30 miles from north to south and an elevation of 8,000 feet above sea level. This area has also been called Chagharzai, because of adjoining Chagharzai areas of Buner District. Opposite Kala Dhaka (officially 'Kala Dhaka' has been renamed 'Tor Ghar'), across the Indus River is Shangla District, mainly the area belonging to Tehsil Martung.

The Indus washes its northern extremity and then turns due south. Between the river and the crest of the range the western slopes are occupied by Yusufzai Pakhtoons. The rest of the range is held by Swatis tribal group of Pakhtoons. The Black Mountain forms a long, narrow ridge, with higher peaks at intervals and occasional deep passes. The highest peak is known as "Machay Sar" and is visible from Agror and other adjoining areas. Numerous spurs project from its sides, forming narrow gorges in which lie the villages of the tribes. The upper parts of the ridge and spurs are covered with thick forests of pine, oak, sycamore, horse-chestnut, and wild cherry; but the slopes are stony and barren.

Administration 
Torghar is a district of Khyber Pakhtunkhwa. It covers an area of 497 km2 (25,8125 acres) and is divided into 16 Union Councils, grouped in two Tehsils.

 Judba Tehsil
 Khander Tehsil

Demographics 
At the time of the 2017 census the district had a population of 171,349, of which 86,059 were males and 85,274 females. The population was entirely rural. The literacy rate was 23.86% - the male literacy rate was 39.02% while the female literacy rate was 9.06%. 22 people in the district were from religious minorities.

At the time of the 2017 census, 96.34% of the population spoke Pashto and 1.54% Hindko as their first language.

Provincial assembly
The district is represented by one elected MPA in the provincial assembly who represent the following constituency:
 PK-58 (Tor Ghar)

The MPA between 2013 and 2018 was Zareen Gul. He is famous political and influential leader of district Torghar active in politics since 1985. He is elected 6 times as MPA and senior most politician in KPK Assembly

References